Göthberg is a surname. Notable people with the surname include:
 Anders Göthberg (1975–2008), Swedish guitarist
 Maja Göthberg (born 1997), Swedish footballer
 Zane Gothberg (born 1992), American ice hockey goaltender

Swedish-language surnames